Surik Sergeyi Khachatryan (born August 1, 1956), known as Liska, is an Armenian politician who formerly served as the governor of the Syunik Province of Armenia, a position from which he resigned in 2013, presumably because of a shooting incident near his mansion in Goris. Prior to that, from 1996 to 1999, he was the mayor of Goris.  A member of Armenia's Republican Party, Khachatryan was also a deputy to the Armenian National Assembly from 1999 to 2004. He has a wife and four children.

On June 2, 2013, Suren Khachatryan's son shot dead Avetik Budaghyan, the brother of Artak Budaghyan, a Nagorno-Karabakh Republic military unit commander in front of Suren Khachatryan's house in Goris. Khachatryan was forced to resign on June 6, 2013 due to public pressure. He was reappointed as the governor of Syunik Province in September 2014 by Prime Minister Hovik Abrahamyan.

He was president of the Syunik provincial council of the Yerkrapah Volunteer Union.

References

Members of the National Assembly (Armenia)
Governors of Syunik
People from Goris
Living people
Republican Party of Armenia politicians
Mayors of places in Armenia
1956 births